Engunyu Janepher Nantume (born 1 December 1978) is a Ugandan politician, legislator and a social worker by profession. She represents the people of Buvuma Islands county (Buvuma District) in the parliament of Uganda. She is a member of the National Resistance Movement (NRM) party, the party in political leadership in Uganda under the chairmanship of Yoweri Kaguta Museveni president of the republic of Uganda.

Education background 
Engunyu started her primary school education from Natteta primary school where she sat her primary leaving examinations (PLE) in 1990. She later enrolled at St Pontiano, Kangulumira for her O'level education and sat her Uganda Certificate of Education (UCE) in 1995. She later joined St. Mathias Kalemba senior secondary school for her A'level education and sat her Uganda Advanced Certificate of Education (UACE) in 1998. She thereafter joined kyambogo University where she pursued a diploma in education in 2000, and later on joined Busoga University where she graduated with a bachelor's degree in social works and social administration (B.SWASA) in 2011. She is currently pursuing a master's degree in public administration from Islamic University in Uganda (IUIU)

Career 
Egunyu served as vice chairperson Buvuma District local government in 2011.

She was also a secondary school teacher at Jinja secondary school and Iganga progressive king of kings from 2000 to 2004.

She served as vice chairperson committee on agriculture, animal industry and fisheries from 2011 to 2013

Egunyu has served as member of parliament of Uganda from 2011 to date. In parliament, She serves on the committee on education and sports and she has served as chairperson of the committee on human rights.

She a member of the National Resistance Movement (NRM) parliamentary caucus and the Buganda caucus

She is a full member of two professional bodies; the Uganda National Teachers Union (UNATU) and the Uganda Red Cross Society

Miscellaneous 
Egunyu's bodyguard shot dead the village National Resistance Movement chairman of kiziba village, Bugaya sub county for allegedly trying to distract Egunyu from addressing village members.

As chairperson committee on human rights, Egunyu has advocated for the observance of human rights, case in point being the investigation into torture in safe houses run by security agencies where the committee clashed with security minister general Elly Tumwine for frustrating the committee's efforts of unearthing the truth.

See also 

 List of members of the tenth Parliament of Uganda
 List of members of the ninth Parliament of Uganda
 National Resistance Movement
 Buvuma District
 Parliament of Uganda
 Robert Ndugwa Migadde

External link 

 Website of the Parliament of Uganda

References 

Living people
1978 births
Islamic University in Uganda alumni
Members of the Parliament of Uganda
Women members of the Parliament of Uganda
Kyambogo University alumni
Busoga University
National Resistance Movement politicians